Dwight Wayne Mathiasen (born May 12, 1963) is a Canadian retired professional ice hockey player who played 33 games in the National Hockey League with the Pittsburgh Penguins between 1986 and 1988. The rest of his career, which lasted from 1986 to 1996, was spent in different minor leagues.

Born in Brandon, Manitoba, Mathiasen was an all-American and all-WCHA player at the University of Denver.

Career statistics

Regular season and playoffs

Awards and honors

References

Transactions
March 31, 1986 – Signed as a free agent by Pittsburgh.

External links
 

1963 births
Living people
AHCA Division I men's ice hockey All-Americans
Baltimore Skipjacks players
Canadian ice hockey right wingers
Fresno Falcons players
Ice hockey people from Manitoba
Muskegon Lumberjacks players
Pittsburgh Penguins players
Sportspeople from Brandon, Manitoba
Undrafted National Hockey League players
Vancouver Bluehawks players